The 2001 Rally de Portugal (formally the 35th TAP Rallye de Portugal) was the third round of the 2001 World Rally Championship. The race was held over four days between 8 March and 11 March 2001, and was won by Mitsubishi's Tommi Mäkinen, his 22nd win in the World Rally Championship.

Background

Entry list

Itinerary
All dates and times are WET (UTC±0).

Results

Overall

World Rally Cars

Classification

Special stages

Championship standings

FIA Cup for Production Rally Drivers

Classification

Special stages

Championship standings

References

External links 
 Official website of the World Rally Championship

Portugal
Rally de Portugal
Rally